Mada Venkateswara Rao (4 June 1935 - 24 October 2015) was an Indian actor from Andhra Pradesh. He acted in more than 600 films. He played notable roles in the films Mutyala Muggu, Lambadolla Ramdasu, and Mayadari Malligadu. He was known for his comedy roles.

He worked as an engineer in the state civil department before becoming an actor. He entered theater as a stage artist and also worked as a cine journalist. Later, he made his debut in films with Sudigundalu. He became popular with the eunuch role he played in the 1977 film Chillara Kottu Chittemma, directed by Dasari Narayana Rao. He played similar roles in subsequent films.

He died on 24 October 2015, while undergoing treatment in a private hospital in Hyderabad.

Filmography
 Andala Ramudu (1973)
Chillara Kottu Chittemma
 Lambadolla Ramdasu
 Chattaniki Kallu Levu
 Mayadari Malligadu
 Gunavantudu
Galipatalu (1974)
Tulabharam (1974) as Giri
Manushullo Devudu (1974)
Mutyala Muggu (1975)
Aradhana (1976)
Muthyala Pallaki (1976) as Pati
 Adavi Ramudu (1977)
Lawyer Viswanath (1978)
 Driver Ramudu (1979)
Sri Madvirata Parvam (1979)
Kodalu Vastunaru Jagratha (1980) as Dance Teacher
Gadasari Atta Sogasari Kodalu (1981)
Oorukichchina Maata (1981) as Daivadheenam
Prema Nakshatram (1982)
Korukunna Mogudu (1982)
Bandhalu Anubandhalu (1982)
Bezawada Bebbuli (1983)
Shakthi (1983)
Adavi Donga (1985)
Aggiraju (1985)
Car Diddina Kapuram (1986) as Seth Kishanlal
Ugra Narasimham (1986)
Krishna Garadi (1986)
Kondaveeti Raja (1986)
Jayam Manade (1986)
Rowdy Babai (1987)
Kirai Dada (1987) as Chitti
Sankharavam (1987) as Ponnu Swamy
Praja Pratinidhi (1988)
Bhale Donga (1989) as Gurbachan Singh
 Allari Premikudu (1994)
 Love Story 1999 (1998)
 Kithakithalu (2006)

References

External links

1935 births
2015 deaths
Telugu male actors
Telugu comedians
Indian male film actors
Male actors from Andhra Pradesh
Male actors in Telugu cinema
20th-century Indian male actors
21st-century Indian male actors
Indian male comedians